Melanie Kurt (January 8, 1879 in Vienna – March 11, 1941 in New York City) was an Austrian opera singer (dramatic soprano).

Life and career 

Melanie Kurt (originally Kohn; she legally changed her name to Kurt in 1902) first studied to become a pianist in her native city of Vienna before starting to take singing lessons. Her teacher was the famous Polish pianist Theodor Leschetizky, who had been a pupil of Carl Czerny's. She was successful at the piano, winning the coveted Liszt Prize. Later she went to Berlin, where Marie Lehmann, sister of the great soprano Lilli Lehmann, became her teacher. From 1897 to 1900 she only appeared as a pianist, before she gave her début at the civic theatre in Lübeck as Elisabeth in Richard Wagner's Tannhäuser in 1902.

From 1903 to 1904 she was engaged at Oper Leipzig, after further studies in Berlin she worked in Braunschweig from 1905 to 1908 before returning to Berlin where she sang at the Berlin Hofoper (today's Staatsoper Unter den Linden), then (from 1912 to 1915) at the Städtische Oper in Charlottenburg (today's Deutsche Oper Berlin).

From her Berlin base, Kurt started her international career, giving successful guest performances at the Royal Opera House Covent Garden, London (since 1910), and during the Salzburg Mozart-Fest in 1910 (which would become the Salzburg Festival later). Later she added La Scala in Milan, the Vienna State Opera, the Dresden Hofoper (the Semperoper) and the Münchner Hofoper (today's Bavarian State Opera) to the list.

Her career reached its peak when she joined the Metropolitan Opera in New York City in 1915 where she succeeded Olive Fremstad as the company's leading Wagner soprano for three seasons. She appeared in 85 Met productions in that time. Her contract ended when the USA joined World War I in 1917 and Wagner operas were banned as being to German. Though the situation was difficult for Kurt she didn't return to Europe at once but stayed in the US until 1919 before returning to Germany.

In the following years she sang mainly in Berlin again, in Leipzig, Stuttgart, Dresden, Vienna and at the famous Wagner Festival in Zoppot (1922), then a serious rival to the Bayreuth Festival.

Around 1930 the singer retreated gradually from stage and started working as a teacher in Berlin. After 1933 Kurt - who was Jewish - had to emigrate to Vienna. In 1938, when the Nazis took over Austria Kurt left the continent for good and returned to the USA, arriving in New York in November 1939. Until her death in 1941 she lived and taught in New York City.

Repertoire 
Considering the obstacles Melanie Kurt had to master – the first World War I, later the advent of the Nazis – she had an extraordinary career, though she was never an overnight star, but built her fame very gradually and with great discipline.

Her long way to the top is mirrored in a large and diverse repertoire: Though Kurt was most famous as a Wagner singer – she appeared as Isolde in Tristan und Isolde 49 times during her three years with the Met –, she also sang Verdi-roles (the title role in Aida, Amelia in Un ballo in maschera), the protagonist in Beethoven's Fidelio, Mozart's Pamina (Die Zauberflöte) and Donna Anna (Don Giovanni), Rachel in Halévy's La Juive, several roles in operas by Ruggiero Leoncavallo, Richard Strauss (the Marschallin in Der Rosenkavalier), Christoph Willibald Gluck, even Handel.

She made many recordings – often with partners like Jacques Urlus or Friedrich Schorr – that are sought after by collectors today, especially those from the period between 1910 and 1915.

The famous German critic Jürgen Kesting in his book about the great singers of the 20th century closes his article about Kurt: "Eine wundervolle Stimme und eine zentrale Sängerin." ("A wonderful voice, a central singer", p. 246)

Literature

 Kesting, Jürgen: Die großen Sänger des 20. Jahrhunderts. ECON Verlag GmbH, Düsseldorf 1993, .

External links
Biography in German

1879 births
1941 deaths
Austrian operatic sopranos
Musicians from Vienna
20th-century Austrian women opera singers
Austro-Hungarian emigrants to the United States